Camp Sheridan was established originally as the Post at Spotted Tail Indian Agency, near the Spotted Tail Agency in northwestern Nebraska in March 1874.  In 1875, the garrison moved into permanent structures on the west fork of Beaver Creek, 12 miles upstream from the White River, near Hay Springs, Nebraska.  The garrison, sometimes called Fort Sheridan, was abandoned seven years later in May 1881.

See also
Crazy Horse

References

Francis Paul Prucha, A Guide to the Military Posts of the United States, 1789-1895 (Madison: The State Historical Society of Wisconsin, 1964).
Thomas R. Buecker, "History of Camp Sheridan, Nebraska," Periodical: Journal of America's Military Past 22 (1995):55-73.

Sheridan
History of Nebraska
History of United States expansionism
19th-century military history of the United States
Sheridan
Buildings and structures in Sheridan County, Nebraska
National Register of Historic Places in Sheridan County, Nebraska